Prince Friedrich Wilhelm Karl of Prussia (3 July 1783 – 28 September 1851) was the son of Frederick William II of Prussia and Frederika Louisa of Hesse-Darmstadt.

Life 
Prince William was the fourth and youngest son of King Frederick William II of Prussia and Princess Frederika Louisa of Hesse-Darmstadt. He served in the Guards from 1799 and fought in 1806 at the head of a cavalry brigade at Battle of Jena and Auerstedt. In December 1807, he traveled to Paris, to try to reduce the war burdens imposed on Prussia by Napoléon Bonaparte; he only managed to obtain a modest reduction.  In 1808, he represented Prussia at the Congress of Erfurt. At the end of 1808, he accompanied his brother, King Frederick William III to St. Petersburg. Later, he had a prominent role in the transformation of Prussia and its army.

During the War of the Sixth Coalition of 1813, he was stationed in Blücher's headquarters.  In the Battle of Lützen (1813) on 2 May, he commanded the reserve cavalry in the left wing of the army and during the Battle of Leipzig, he negotiated the union of the Northern army with Blucher's. Later he led the 8th Brigade of the Yorck's army corps on the Rhine and distinguished himself by bravery and military skills at the battles of Château-Thierry, Laon and outside Paris.

After the Treaty of Paris (1814), the Prince accompanied the king to London and then attended the negotiations of the Congress of Vienna. In 1815 during the Waterloo Campaign he commanded the reserve cavalry of the Prussian IV Corps (Bülow's). After the second Treaty of Paris, he lived mostly in Paris and sometimes at his Fischbach Castle in Kowary in the Riesengebirge mountains.

From 1824 to 1829 he was governor of the Confederate Fortress at Mainz; from 1830 to 1831 he was governor-general of the Rhine Province and Westphalia. In this capacity, on 20 September 1831 he opened the first rail line on German soil from Hinsbeck via the Deilbach valley to Nierenhof. Until then, the line had been called Deilthaler Eisenbahn ("Deil Valley Railway"); after its opening it was allowed to call itself Prinz-Wilhelm-Eisenbahn-Gesellschaft.

In March 1834 he was appointed general of cavalry and re-appointed as governor of the federal fortress at Mainz. He should not be confused with his nephew of the same name, the future emperor William I, who was governor of the same fortress in 1854.

After the death of his wife, Marie Anna, on 14 April 1846, he withdrew from public life at his Fischbach castle.

Marriage and issue 
He married his first cousin Landgravine Marie Anna of Hesse-Homburg, daughter of Frederick V, Landgrave of Hesse-Homburg, and Caroline of Hesse-Darmstadt (his mother's sister), together they had nine children:
 Princess Amalie Friederike Luise Karoline Wilhelmine of Prussia (4 July 1805 – 23 November 1805); died in infancy.
 Princess Irene of Prussia (born and died 3 November 1806); stillborn.
 Unnamed son (born and died 30 August 1809); stillborn.
 Prince Friedrich Tassilo Wilhelm of Prussia (29 October 1811 – 9 January 1813); died in infancy.
 Prince Heinrich Wilhelm Adalbert of Prussia (29 October 1811 – 6 June 1873); married morganatically, in 1850, Therese Elssler and had issue.
 Prince Friedrich Wilhelm Tassilo of Prussia (15 November 1813 – 9 January 1814); died in infancy.
 Princess Marie Elisabeth Karoline Viktoria of Prussia (18 June 1815 – 21 March 1885); married, in 1836, Prince Karl of Hesse and by Rhine and had issue.
 Prince Friedrich Wilhelm Waldemar of Prussia (2 August 1817 – 17 February 1849), never married.
 Princess Marie Friederike Franziska Hedwig of Prussia (15 October 1825 – 17 May 1889); married, in 1842, King Maximilian II of Bavaria and had issue.

Honours 
He received the following orders and decorations:

Ancestors

Siblings 
 Frederica Charlotte (1767–1820), who became Duchess of York by her marriage to Frederick, Duke of York
 Frederick William III of Prussia (1770–1840)
 Christine (1772–73)
 Louis Charles (1773–96)
 Frederica Louisa Wilhelmina (1774–1837), wife of William of Orange, afterwards King William I of the Netherlands
 Augusta (1780–1841), wife of William II, Elector of Hesse
 Henry (1781–1846)

Notes

References 
 
 , 

1783 births
1851 deaths
House of Hohenzollern
Prussian princes
Military personnel from Berlin
Prussian commanders of the Napoleonic Wars
Generals of Cavalry (Prussia)
Recipients of the Iron Cross, 2nd class
Recipients of the Pour le Mérite (military class)
Commanders Cross of the Military Order of Maria Theresa
Grand Crosses of the Order of Saint Stephen of Hungary
Knights Grand Cross of the Military Order of William
Recipients of the Order of St. George of the Third Degree
Recipients of the Order of St. Vladimir, 2nd class
Knights Grand Cross of the Order of the Sword
Honorary Knights Grand Cross of the Order of the Bath
Burials at Berlin Cathedral
Sons of kings